For diseases of foliage plants, see the following lists:

List of Croton diseases
List of Ficus diseases
List of foliage plant diseases (Acanthaceae)
List of foliage plant diseases (Agavaceae)
List of foliage plant diseases (Araceae)
List of foliage plant diseases (Arecaceae)
List of foliage plant diseases (Araliaceae)
List of foliage plant diseases (Araucariacea)
List of foliage plant diseases (Asclepiadaceae)
List of foliage plant diseases (Bromeliaceae)
List of foliage plant diseases (Cactaceae)
List of foliage plant diseases (Commelinaceae)
List of foliage plant diseases (Gesneriaceae)
List of foliage plant diseases (Maranthaceae)
List of foliage plant diseases (Polypodiaceae)
List of foliage plant diseases (Urticaceae)
List of foliage plant diseases (Vitaceae)
List of Peperomia diseases
List of Radermachera sinica diseases

Foliage plant